United We Can is a Costa Rican classical liberal political party founded by the former deputy and former Libertarian Movement member Natalia Díaz Quintana. The party culminated its process of cantonal and provincial assemblies in November 2018 allowing it to participate in the 2020 Costa Rican municipal elections.

The party was founded by Díaz, who was deputy for the 2014-2018 period from Otto Guevara's Libertarian Movement. She would face Guevara in the party's first primary election, the National Libertarian Convention of 2017. Diaz lost with only a 10% gap. Díaz would not support Guevara as a candidate in the 2018 general election and would in fact give her adhesion to PNL nominee Antonio Álvarez Desanti. She started the creation of the party shortly after the presidential run ended, concluding it in November 2018.

As of 2018, the party began talks with other political forces such as New Generation, the Christian Democratic Alliance, Costa Rican Renewal, the Social Christian Republican Party, the Libertarian Movement and a faction of the Social Christian Unity Party to negotiate a right-wing coalition for the 2022 election; however, the talks stalled.

Electoral performance

Presidential

Parliamentary

References

See also
 Liberalism in Costa Rica

Liberal parties in Costa Rica
Political parties in Costa Rica
Classical liberal parties
Political parties established in 2018